The New Cities is a Canadian Juno Award and ADISQ Award nominated band originating from Trois-Rivières, Quebec, and currently based in Montreal, Quebec. The current members of The New Cities are David Brown, Christian Bergeron, Nicolas Denis, Francis Fugere, Philippe Lachance, and Julien Martre.

Early years
The band recorded their first EP album with producer Steve Nadeau in Montreal, Quebec, in early 2006. They independently released it under the name "The New Cities EP" a few months later and started touring Canada. The band met producer Greig Nori in the spring of 2006 and started working with him on new material which led to signing a record deal with Sony Music Canada in October 2008.

Lost In City Lights

Following their signing with Sony Music Canada, the band released their first full-length album Lost in City Lights in May 2009.

Their debut single "Dead End Countdown" peaked at No. 16 on the Canadian Hot 100, won the 2010 SOCAN Pop/Rock Music Award and was nominated in 2 categories at the Canadian Radio Music Awards. The music video for "Dead End Countdown" was nominated at the 2009 MuchMusic Video Awards.

The New Cities' second single "Leaders Of The Misled" was featured in the TV movie Degrassi Takes Manhattan, part of Season 9 of the TV series Degrassi: The Next Generation. The track "Lost in City Lights" was featured in the third season of Gossip Girl.

In support of Lost in City Lights, TNC toured with acts such as Simple Plan, Hedley, Marianas Trench, Carly Rae Jepsen, ILL Scarlett, Mobile, Faber Drive and Ten Second Epic. They have opened for major acts such as The Black Eyed Peas, Katy Perry, NIN, Sum 41 and Metric. They also toured the UK twice and France in the winter of 2009–2010.

Kill the Lights
The band's second album, Kill the Lights was released on September 27, 2011. The first single called "Heatwave", co-written by the band and The Matrix, has been released on June 16, 2011.

Following the release of their new album, the band joined Avril Lavigne in Canada to support her 2011 Black Star Tour in October. Notable performances in 2012 include the SXSW festival in Austin, Texas and the Bamboozle festival in Asbury Park, New Jersey.

Members

Current members
 David Brown - Lead vocals (2005–present)
 Julien Martre - Backing vocals, Bassist (2008–present)
 Christian Bergeron - Guitarist (2005–present)
 Francis Fugere - Drums (2007–present)
 Nicolas Denis - Synth (2005–present)
 Philippe Lachance - Synth (2005–present)

Discography

Albums

Singles

Compilation appearances

Music videos

The music video for "Dead End Countdown" was released in the UK and Ireland in March 2010. It has been added to Kerrang! TV, Scuzz TV, NME TV, Chart Show TV and The Box playlists.

Appearances in other media
 2009. Their song "Lost in City Lights" was used in Season 3 of Gossip Girl.
 2009. Their song "Dead End Countdown" was used in Season 2, Episode 4 of So You Think You Can Dance Canada.
 2010. Their song "Hypertronic Superstar" was used in Season 3, Episode 5 of So You Think You Can Dance Canada.
 2010. Their song "Leaders of the Misled" was used in the film Degrassi Takes Manhattan.

Awards and nominations

|-
| 2012 || "Heatwave" || MuchMusic Video Awards"Post-Production of the Year"|| 
|-
| 2010 || "Dead End Countdown" || SOCAN"POP/ROCK music award" || 
|-
|  || "The New Cities" || JUNO Canada's Music Awards"New Group of the Year" || 
|-
| 2010 || "Lost in City Lights" || ADISQ"Album Anglophone de l'année"|| 
|-
| 2010 || "The New Cities" || Canadian Radio Music Awards"Best New group or solo artist of the year (HOT AC)" || 
|-
| 2010 || "The New Cities" || Canadian Radio Music Awards"Best New group or solo artist of the year (CHR)" || 
|-
| 2009 || "Dead End Countdown" || MuchMusic Video Awards"Post-Production of the Year"|| 
|-

References

External links
The New Cities Official Website
The New Cities YouTube channel

Musical groups established in 2005
Musical groups disestablished in 2013
Trois-Rivières
Canadian pop punk groups
English-language musical groups from Quebec
2005 establishments in Quebec
2013 disestablishments in Quebec